Jorge García Torre (born 13 January 1984 in Gijón, Asturias), known simply as Jorge, is a Spanish professional footballer who plays for UD Llanera as a central defender.

His twin brother Alejandro was also a footballer (goalkeeper). Both began their career at Sporting de Gijón, and finished it with amateurs UD Llanera.

References

External links

1984 births
Living people
Spanish twins
Twin sportspeople
Spanish footballers
Footballers from Gijón
Association football defenders
La Liga players
Segunda División players
Segunda División B players
Tercera División players
Tercera Federación players
Sporting de Gijón B players
Sporting de Gijón players
Gimnàstic de Tarragona footballers
Real Murcia players
CD Lugo players
UE Costa Brava players
Burgos CF footballers
CF Rayo Majadahonda players
UP Langreo footballers